Crno na belo (Black and white) is the title of the comeback single by the Serbian punk rock band Goblini, featuring the songs "Luna" ("The Moon"), written during the rehearsals held in May 2010, and "Kao da" ("As if"), written during the U magnovenju recording sessions. The single was released as a collaboration between Studentski kulturni centar Novi Sad and the Šabački Letnji Festival, on which the band performed the first reunion show.

Track listing 
Lyrics for all tracks written by Branko Golubović. Track 1 music written by Goblini, track 2 music written by Branko Golubović and Alen Jovanović. Track 2 arranged by Goblini.

References 
 New single info at the official site
 Crno na belo at Discogs

2010 singles
2010 songs